The 4.6×30mm (designated as the 4,6 × 30 by the C.I.P.) cartridge is a small-caliber, high-velocity, smokeless powder, rebated rim, bottlenecked centerfire cartridge designed for personal defense weapons (PDW) developed by German armament manufacturer Heckler & Koch (HK) in 1999. It was designed primarily for the MP7 PDW to minimize weight and recoil while increasing penetration of body armor. It features a bottlenecked case and a pointed, steel-core, brass-jacketed bullet.

Development
The 4.6×30mm cartridge was introduced in 1999 as a competitor to FN Herstal's 5.7×28mm cartridge. Heckler & Koch started the development of a semi-automatic handgun for their 4.6×30mm PDW cartridge, but Heckler & Koch cancelled the Ultimate Combat Pistol (UCP) at the prototype stage.

Overview
Compared to standard intermediate cartridges one can carry more 4.6×30mm ammunition due to the lower weight and relatively small dimensions of the cartridge. Also, due to the lower weight of the bullet, aiming in rapid fire is much easier as recoil depends much on the weight of the bullet. CRISAT testing shows that because of the smaller diameter and high projectile velocity of the round, body armor penetration is higher than that of traditional handgun projectiles.

A series of tests performed by NATO in the United Kingdom and France indicated that 5.7×28mm was a superior cartridge. The results of the NATO tests were analyzed by a group of experts from France, the United States, Canada, and the United Kingdom and the group's conclusion was that the 5.7×28mm was "undoubtedly" the more efficient cartridge.

Among other points, the NATO group cited superior effectiveness (27% greater) for the 5.7×28mm against unprotected targets and equal effectiveness against protected targets. It also cited less sensitivity to extreme temperatures for the 5.7×28mm and cited a greater potential risk of barrel erosion with the 4.6×30mm. In addition, the group pointed out that 5.7×28mm is close to the 5.56×45mm NATO by its design and manufacture process, allowing it to be manufactured on existing production lines. The group also pointed out that 5.7×28mm weapons are more mature than 4.6×30mm weapons, and the 5.7×28mm FN Five-seveN pistol was already in production at that time, while the 4.6×30mm Heckler & Koch UCP pistol was still only an early concept. However, the German delegation and others rejected the NATO recommendation that 5.7×28mm be standardized, and as a result, the standardization process was indefinitely halted, though both cartridges would ultimately be standardized by NATO with STANAG 4509 for 5.7×28mm and STANAG 4820 for 4.6×30mm respectively.

Cartridge dimensions
The 4.6×30mm has 0.87 mL (13.4 grains) H2O cartridge case capacity.

4.6×30mm maximum C.I.P. cartridge dimensions; all sizes in millimeters (mm).

Americans define the shoulder angle at alpha/2 ≈ 22 degrees. The common rifling twist rate for this cartridge is 160 mm (1 in 6.3 in), 6 grooves, Ø lands = 4.52 mm, Ø grooves = 4.65 mm, land width = 1.21 mm and the primer type is small rifle.

According to the official C.I.P. (Commission Internationale Permanente pour l'Epreuve des Armes à Feu Portatives) rulings, the 4.6×30mm can handle up to  Pmax (the nominal maximum) piezo pressure. In C.I.P. regulated countries, every rifle cartridge combination has to be proofed at 125% of this maximum C.I.P. pressure to be certified for sale to consumers, referred to as "PE". This means that 4.6×30mm chambered arms in C.I.P. regulated countries are currently (2018) proof tested at  PE piezo pressure.
Despite the relatively high Pmax the bolt thust of the 4.6×30mm is on a similar level when compared with traditional service sidearm cartridges.

The Belgian 5.7×28mm cartridge introduced in 1993 is probably the closest currently available ballistic twin of the 4.6×30mm.

The 4.6×30mm ammunition is produced by RUAG Ammotec, Fiocchi and BAE Systems.

Variations

2 g DM11 Penetrator Ultimate Combat
The German Army version of the 4.6×30mm cartridge (DM11 Penetrator) weighs 6.5 g and uses a 2-g copper-plated steel bullet projectile at  muzzle velocity. The DM11 Penetrator cartridge is designed for the MP7. The Ultimate Combat can penetrate the NATO CRISAT target at more than 200 meters. This ammunition combines energy transfer in soft targets and very good penetration. The muzzle velocity V0 and V100 indicate a G1 ballistic coefficient of approximately 0.141 to 0.150 (BCs are somewhat debatable) making the DM11 projectile aerodynamically more efficient compared to typical service handgun projectiles, but less efficient compared to typical assault rifle projectiles. At the stated effective range of 200 m, the DM11 projectile will be traveling at approximately Mach 1.25 (425 m/s) under International Standard Atmosphere (ISA) conditions at sea level (air density ρ = 1.225 kg/m3).

2 g Action Law Enforcement hollow point
The Action 4.6×30mm Law Enforcement cartridge weighs 6.5 g and is loaded with a 2 g CuZn-alloy (brass) solid hollow point projectile that achieves 700 m/s (2,300 ft/s) muzzle velocity. The cartridge is designed for the MP7. This ammunition is optimized for energy transfer in soft targets and to offer decent penetration performance on hard and combined targets like car doors or glass and body armor. The muzzle velocity V0 and V50 indicate a G1 ballistic coefficient of  0.112 to 0.119. At the stated effective range of 200 m, the 2 g Action projectile travels at approximately Mach 1.67 (586 m/s or 1923 f/s) under International Standard Atmosphere conditions at sea level (air density ρ = 1.225 kg/m3).

Action Law Enforcement cartridge technical data:
Temperature range: -30 °C to +52 °C
Velocity, energy at 0 m: 700 m/s, 480 joules
Velocity, energy at 50 m: 568 m/s, 322 joules
Ballistic coefficient C 1: 0.112-0.119 (ICAO)/(Army Metro)
Mean chamber pressure: max. 400 MPa
Penetration in 20% gelatine: bare at 25 m: < 30 cm
Accuracy at 50 m: Ø 5 cm
Effective service range:

2.7 g full metal jacket 4.6×30mm
The ball 4.6×30mm cartridge weighs 7 g and is loaded with a 2.7 g full metal jacket projectile with a PbSb-alloy core and a copper-plated steel jacket that achieves 600 m/s (2,000 ft/s) muzzle velocity. The cartridge is designed for the MP7. This ammunition is optimized for energy transfer in soft targets and offers good precision. The muzzle velocity V0 and V100 indicate a G1 ballistic coefficient of  0.171 to 0.187. At the stated effective range of 200 m, the 2.7 g ball projectile travels at approximately Mach 1.36 (463 m/s) under International Standard Atmosphere conditions at sea level (air density ρ = 1.225 kg/m3).

Ball cartridge technical data:
Temperature range: between -54 °C and +52 °C
Velocity, energy at 0 m: 600 m/s, 486 Joules
Velocity, energy at 100 m: 463 m/s, 320 Joules
Ballistic coefficient C 1: 0.171-0.187 (ICAO)/(Army Metro)
Mean chamber pressure: max. 400 MPa
Penetration in gelatine bare at 25 m: < 35 cm
Accuracy at 100 m: Ø 8 cm
Effective range:~ (HK claims that the FMJ round has more retained energy than the "Combat Steel" due to the FMJ's heavier projectile.)

Others

VBR produces a 4.6×30mm two-part controlled fragmenting projectile that is claimed to increase the content of the permanent wound cavity and double the chance to hit a vital organ.
Heckler & Koch claims that the CPS Black Tip ammunition made by Fiocchi has a muzzle energy of approximately 525 J that is comparable to 9×19mm rounds.

See also

References

 C.I.P. decisions, texts and tables (free current C.I.P. CD-ROM version download (ZIP and RAR format))
RUAG Ammotec 2.0 g German Army 4.6×30mm Penetrator DM11 cartridge factsheet
RUAG Ammotec 2.0 g Law Enforcement 4.6×30mm cartridge factsheet 
 RUAG Ammotec 2.7 g Ball 4.6×30mm cartridge factsheet

External links
PDW and 4.6 ammo overview on hkpro.com
JBM Small Arms Ballistics Ballistic Coefficient (Velocity) Calculator

Pistol and rifle cartridges
Military cartridges